The 2009 season was the fifth for the Cervélo TestTeam Women (UCI code: CWT), which started in 2005 as the Univega Pro Cycling Team.

Roster
 Katharina Alberti
 Kristin Armstrong
 Emilie Aubry
 Regina Bruins
 Lieselot Decroix
 Sandra Dietel
 Sarah Düster
 Claudia Lichtenberg
 Emma Pooley
 Carla Ryan
 Pascale Schnider
 Patricia Schwager
 Christiane Soeder
 Élodie Touffet
 Kirsten Wild

Season victories

Results in major races

Women's World Cup 2009

Kirsten Wild finished 3rd in the individual and the team finished 1st in the teams overall standing.

UCI World Ranking

The team finished 1st in the UCI ranking for teams.

References

2009 UCI Women's Teams seasons
2009 in Swiss women's sport
Cervélo TestTeam